USS Gates may refer to the following ships of the United States Navy:

 , a galley built in 1776 and scuttled in 1777 to prevent capture by British forces
 , a cruiser launched 14 December 1985 and decommissioned 15 December 2005

United States Navy ship names